The 2018 Independence Bowl was a college football bowl game played on December 27, 2018. It was the 43rd edition of the Independence Bowl, and one of the 2018–19 bowl games concluding the 2018 FBS football season. Sponsored by Walk-On's Bistreaux & Bar, the game was officially known as the Walk-On's Independence Bowl.

Teams
The bowl has conference tie-ins with the Southeastern Conference (SEC) and Atlantic Coast Conference (ACC). However, as four SEC teams were selected for New Year's Six games, bowl organizers announced a matchup of Temple of the American Athletic Conference (The American), rather than an SEC team, and Duke of the ACC. This was the first meeting between Duke and Temple.

Temple Owls

Temple received and accepted a bid to the Independence Bowl on December 2. The Owls entered the bowl with an 8–4 record (7–1 in conference), having won 6-of-7 to end their regular season. As Temple head coach Geoff Collins resigned in order to take the same position at Georgia Tech, the Owls were led in the Independence Bowl by interim head coach Ed Foley.

Duke Blue Devils

Duke received and accepted a bid to the Independence Bowl on December 2. The Blue Devils entered the bowl with a 7–5 record (3–5 in conference), having lost 4-of-6 to end their regular season.

Game summary

Scoring summary

Statistics

References

Further reading

External links
 Box score at ESPN

Independence Bowl
Independence Bowl
Independence Bowl
Independence Bowl
Duke Blue Devils football bowl games
Temple Owls football bowl games